Xylocopa combusta is a species of carpenter bee.

Description
Xylocopa combusta has a black body with black hair on the head and the thorax. Bristles on the pygidial area are reddish.

Distribution
This species can be found in Sierra Leone, Equatorial Guinea, Democratic Republic of the Congo, Somalia, Ethiopia, Tanzania, Mozambique, Angola.

References 

Eardley, C. D. (1987) Catalogue of Apoidea (Hymenoptera) in Africa south of the Sahara, Part 1, The genus Xylocopa Latreille (Anthophoridae), Entomology Memoir, No. 70
B. Bonelli, “Osservazioni etoecologiche sugli Imenotteri aculeati dell'Etiopia. VII Xylocopa (Mesotrichia) combusta Smith (Hymenoptera Anthophoridae),” Bollettino dell'Istituto di Entomologia della Universita degli Studi di Bologna, vol. 33, pp. 1–31, 1976.

combusta
Insects described in 1854